Zgornje Danje (in older sources also Zgornje Dajne) is a high-elevation settlement in the Municipality of Železniki in the Upper Carniola region of Slovenia. Although there are seven houses in the settlement, it no longer has any permanent residents. It includes the hamlet of Trojar.

References

External links

Zgornje Danje at Geopedia

Populated places in the Municipality of Železniki